Peter King Nzioki Mwania (born 25 May 1978), popularly known as Peter King, is a Kenyan actor. He is best known for his roles in the films The Constant Gardener, The Fifth Estate and Sense8.

Personal life
Nzioki was born on 25 May 1978 in Nairobi, Kenya. His father Michael David Mwania, served in the Kenyan Army and his mother worked at the military hospital. At the age of six, he joined church productions at the Lang’ata Barracks. He completed his education from Lang’ata High School in Nairobi.

He is married to fellow actress Tess King.

Career
He made acting debut in 2000 at the Kenya National Theatre for three years under the guidance of Joab Kanuka. In theater, he played 'Iago' in the Phoenix Players production of the Shakespeare tragedy Othello. In 2005, he made his film debut with a minor role in The Constant Gardener directed by Fernando Meirelles. In the same year, he appeared as 'Barman' in the television movie Transit. In 2016, he appeared in the thriller film The CEO where he played the role of 'Jomo'. The film had its premier 10 July 2016, at the Eko Hotels & Suites, Victoria Island, Lagos and later received critical acclaim.

He made some notable appearances as 'Mkwajo' in award-winning musical Mo Faya directed by Eric Wainaina; scheming spouse in FaceBook and corrupt politician 'Mzito' in Ni Sisi. After several villainous roles, he received the role as stepfather in MTV series Shuga 2, then as an inspiring soccer coach in The Inside Story aired in Discovery Channel; and a preacher in The Knife Grinder’s Tale.

In 2016, he was selected for the role as Kenyan crime lord 'Silas Kabaka' in the Netflix series Sense8.https://en.wikipedia.org/wiki/Sense8 The role made him a popular television actor in Kenya.

Filmography

See also
 List of Black Sails characters

References

External links
 

Living people
Kenyan male television actors
1979 births
21st-century Kenyan male actors
Kenyan male film actors